This is a list of members of the National Congress of Belgium.  The National Congress was the constituent assembly of Belgium, sitting from 1830 to 1831.  It had 200 members, elected on 3 November 1830 to represent modern Belgium, Luxembourg, and Limburg.  When those elected died or resigned from the Congress, substitutes took their places, meaning that a total of 236 people sat in the Congress.

These people represented a range of political opinions.  Orangists favoured reconciliation with the Netherlands, whilst Unionists favoured secession and union with France.

List

References
 

Members of the National Congress of Belgium